Telangana State Beverages Corporation Ltd (TSBCL) is a public sector company owned by the government of Telangana, which has a monopoly over wholesale and retail vending of alcohol in Telangana. It controls the retail sale of Indian Made Foreign Liquor (IMFL) and beer trade in the state.

History
Telangana State Beverages Corporation Ltd was constituted on 2 June 2014 under the Companies Act 1956.

References

State agencies of Telangana
Alcohol in India
Economy of Telangana
Alcohol monopolies
Drink companies of India
2014 establishments in Telangana
Food and drink companies established in 2014
Indian companies established in 2014